Colm O'Driscoll (born 9 June 1988) is an Irish Gaelic footballer who used to plays as a left wing-forward for the Cork senior team and currently coaches Ilen Rovers.

Born in Caheragh, County Cork, O'Driscoll first arrived on the inter-county scene at the age of sixteen when he first linked up with the Cork minor team, before later joining the under-21 and junior sides. He made his senior debut during the 2014 championship. Since then O'Driscoll has become a regular member of the starting fifteen.

At club level O'Driscoll plays with Tadhg Mac Cárthaigh's.

O'Driscoll's brothers, Brian and Kevin, as well as his father, Gene, have all played for Cork.

Honours

Team

Cork
All-Ireland Junior Football Championship (2): 2009, 2013
Munster Junior Football Championship (2): 2009, 2013
All-Ireland Under-21 Football Championship (2): 2007 )sub), 2009
Munster Under-21 Football Championship (2): 2007 (sub), 2009
Munster Minor Football Championship (1): 2005

References

1988 births
Living people
Tadhg Mac Cárthaigh's Gaelic footballers
Cork inter-county Gaelic footballers